Bored Panda is a Lithuanian website that publishes articles about "entertaining and amusing news". It was founded in 2009 by Tomas Banišauskas, who was then a business administration student at Vilnius University. 

As of November 2017, the site had 41 employees. It makes most of its revenue from the advertisements that run on the site. LRT has described Bored Panda as a "Lithuanian success story".

History 
Bored Panda was founded in 2009 by Tomas Banišauskas, a Vilnius University student studying business administration. According to Banišauskas, there was a "serious offer" to buy the company from a businessperson listed on the "Forbes' 100 rich list".

Popularity 
According to NewsWhip, Bored Panda's Facebook page received over 30 million likes, shares, comments, and reactions in October 2017, more than any other English-language news website that month. Bored Panda also reported that it was viewed by 116 million unique visitors that month. 

In November 2017, Wired reported that the site had flourished despite Facebook cracking down on attention-grabbing clickbait headlines, a change that had made controversial political news much more successful on the platform. Banišauskas attributes the success of his site to his belief the site publishes a small number of higher-quality articles and avoids clickbait headlines.

Reception 
Wired contributor Evan Griffith described Bored Panda as "...a throwback to when the Internet was less an addictive, stress-inducing reflection of the ugliness of modern life, and more a place to kill time when we were bored."

References

External links

Internet properties established in 2009
Lithuanian news websites
2009 establishments in Lithuania
English-language websites